Frank Thomson may refer to:
 Frank Thomson (railroad executive)
 Frank Thomson (footballer)
 Frank Wyville Thomson, Scottish military surgeon and expert on tropical medicine

See also
 Francis Thomson (disambiguation)
 Frank Thompson (disambiguation)